Michael Joshua Lambek  (born 11 June 1950) is Canadian anthropologist who serves as professor of anthropology at the University of Toronto Scarborough. He is a specialist in the anthropology of religion.

Selected publications
Human Spirits: A Cultural Account of Trance in Mayotte (1981)
Knowledge and Practice in Mayotte: Local Discourses of Islam, Sorcery and Spirit Possession (1993)
Tense Past (edited with Paul Antze, 1996)
Ecology and the Sacred (edited with Ellen Messer, 2001)
The Weight of the Past: Living with History in Mahajanga, Madagascar (2002)
Illness and Irony (edited with Paul Antze, 2003)
A Reader in the Anthropology of Religion (2nd ed. 2008)
Ordinary Ethics: Anthropology, Language, and Action (ed. 2010)
Island in the Stream: An Ethnographic History of Mayotte (2018)
Concepts and Persons (2021)
Behind the Glass: The Villa Tugendhat and Its Family (2022)

References 

1950 births
Anthropologists of religion
Canadian anthropologists
Fellows of the Royal Society of Canada
Living people
McGill University alumni
University of Michigan alumni
Academic staff of the University of Toronto Scarborough